(Pyruvate, water dikinase)-phosphate phosphotransferase (PSRP) is an enzyme with systematic name (pyruvate, water dikinase) phosphate:phosphate phosphotransferase. This enzyme catalyses the following chemical reaction

 [pyruvate, water dikinase] phosphate + phosphate  [pyruvate, water dikinase] + diphosphate

The enzyme from the bacterium Escherichia coli is bifunctional.

References

External links 
 

EC 2.7.4